Waiora Te Ūkaipō - The Homeland is a 1996 play by New Zealand playwright Hone Kouka. The play describes the social dislocation that happens to Māori who leave their tribal lands. It is the first part of a trilogy with Homefires (1998) and The Prophet (2004), and the teenagers of The Prophet are the children of Waiora's Amiria, Rongo and Boyboy.

History 
The play was commissioned by the Wellington International Festival of the Arts. Kouka has described the play as about immigrants, writing "unfortunately the immigrants in the play are Māori, displaced in their own country." The play was published by Huia Publishers in 2007 and then by Playmarket in 2019. Kouka says of the play that it is play is big in scope and 'naturalistic and impressionistic'.

Characters 
The Whanau (family)

 John/Hone - the father, late thirties, has always worked outside
 Sue/Wai Te Atatu - the mother, had her children in her teens
 Amiria - 19, eldest daughter, a beauty, thinks of herself as Pākehā
 Rongo - 18, daddy's girl, sings like a tūī, but not since leaving Waiora
 Boyboy - 16, whangai (adopted), sporty, loves the outdoors

The Guests

 Steve Campbell - Hone's boss, Pākehā, late 30s or early 40s.
 Louise Stones - a secondary school teacher, twenties, Pākehā, outspoken, liberal and not a local
 The Tīpuna (ancestors) - a group of four ancestors, whose focus is Rongo. A metaphor for what has been left behind.
 The Stranger: one of the tīpuna

Synopsis 
The play is set on a beach, on the east coast of the South Island in late summer, March, in the year 1965. The Waiora of the title is a fictional place on the East Coast of the North Island. Hone has recently moved his family to the South Island for work in a timber mill. The whanau have gathered on the beach to celebrate Rongo's 18th birthday, and have invited Louise, as Wai's friend and Boyboy's teacher, and Steve as guest of honour. The whanau are expecting Steve to promote Hone (who Steve calls John) to foreman at the mill.

The play opens with the tīpuna walking on the beach, singing of their sadness at leaving their original homeland with the waiata "Taukuri e". Now the place is prepared, the whanau arrive to set up for their celebration. Boyboy is proud to be putting down his first hangi, but in his desperation to please Hone, leaves the fire unattended to collect mussels, and the fire gets out of control.

Louise presses Steve to tell Hone about the promotion, but Steve tells her he has a bonus for Hone, not a promotion. Boyboy overhears, and reveals to the whanau that Steve isn't going to promote Hone because he is Māori and it wouldn't be accepted. Amiria admits that she is going to marry her Pākeha boyfriend and move to Auckland. Rongo retreats and withdraws from the conflict and is later found unresponsive in the water. Through karakia and haka she is brought back from the tīpuna.

Productions

Critical reception 

Nancy Brunning remembered a variety of responses to the first productions of Waiora: "The response to the '96 première of Waiora ranged from standing ovations to heated debates. It brought many Māori together and it angered many Pākehā who were turned off by the portrayal of Pākehā/Māori relationships. Some audiences, Pākehā and Māori alike, took offence at a Māori play daring to say Māori were being treated like immigrants in their own country."Critic Murray Edmond says "Waiora was the play which gave Hone Kouka a significant presence in New Zealand theatre as a Māori playwright." David O'Donnell considers that the success of plays such as Waiora and Briar Grace-Smith's Purapurawhetū "is partly due to their dynamic fusion of traditional Māori performance traditions with the dramatic structures inherited from European playwriting." The productions at the Brighton Festival and the tour in Hawaii were considered "a great success". Kouka said "Its uniqueness became a highlighted point. Previously we had been in the shadows of New Zealand theatre. From a world viewpoint, it's the other way round." At the Whakatāne performance, the audience replied to the haka with their own.

Sonia Yee, the first Chinese woman graduate of Toi Whakaari, credits Waiora as one of the drama pieces which made her want to go to drama school. Rajeev Verma, part of "Those Indian Guys" in Auckland, also considers Waiora as formative: "I saw this story that was truthful, and it was about people that were relevant to this country. And it had a very clear purpose for our New Zealand community."

References 

New Zealand plays
Theatre in New Zealand
Plays about families
Plays about race and ethnicity
1996 plays
Works about Māori people